Hueffer is an English surname. Notable people with the surname include:

 Ford Hermann Hueffer (1873–1939), English novelist, poet, critic, and editor
 Francis Hueffer (1845–1889), German-English writer
 Oliver Madox Hueffer (1877–1931), author and playwright

English-language surnames